Cordate is an adjective meaning 'heart-shaped' and is most typically used for:
 Cordate (leaf shape), in plants
 Cordate axe, a prehistoric stone tool

See also 
 Chordate, a member of a major phylum of animals
 Cordata (disambiguation)